Castaways Beach is a coastal suburb in the Shire of Noosa, Queensland, Australia.

Geography

The suburb is bounded to the east by the Coral Sea and to the west by Lake Weyba. Apart from the eastern strip of housing along the coast, most of Castaways Beach is within the Noosa National Park.

Castaways Creek rises in the south of the suburb and flows east into the Coral Sea. Its mouth divides the sandy coast into two beaches:

 Castaways Beach extending north to the neighbouring suburb of Sunrise Beach
 Marcus Beach extending south to the neighbouring suburb of Marcus Beach

The beach Castaways Beach is dog friendly and without lifeguards.

History
Between 2008 and 2013 Castaways Beach was within the Sunshine Coast Region (following an unpopular local government amalgamation that was subsequently reversed).

The predominant age group in Castaways Beach is 45–54 years.

Education 
There are no schools in Castaways Beach. The nearest government primary and secondary school are Sunshine Beach State School and Sunshine Beach State High School, both in Sunshine Beach to the north.

References

Suburbs of Noosa Shire, Queensland
Beaches of Queensland